Max Best Harris (born 17 August 2001) is an English cricketer who plays for Middlesex County Cricket Club. He is a right-handed batsman and a right-arm fast-medium pace bowler.

Early life
Harris was an accomplished tennis player as a youngster but preferred the mate-ship of team sports. He made his debut for the Middlesex academy at 17 years old.

Career
Harris played for North Middlesex Cricket Club alongside future Middlesex teammates Ethan Bamber, Joe Cracknell and Luke Hollman. Harris was awarded his first professional county contract in April 2021. Harris made his T20 Blast debut for Middlesex against Somerset on 1 July 2022 at Lords. He took 2 wickets on debut including that of South African international Rilee Rossouw. On his second appearance on the 3 July 2022 against Gloucestershire he again took 2 wickets as he improved his figures to 2/26. Harris made his List-A debut for Middlesex on August 14, 2022, against Somerset and hit the winning runs in a one wicket victory at Taunton.

References

External links

2001 births
English cricketers
Middlesex cricketers
Living people